Hamayne is an alkaloid present in plants of the family Amaryllidaceae, including Iberian Narcissus species and two Nigerian Crinum species, reported to have acetylcholinesterase inhibitory activity. The product has been made via total synthesis as well.

References 

Isoquinoline alkaloids
Quinoline alkaloids
Benzodioxoles
Secondary alcohols
Oxygen heterocycles
Nitrogen heterocycles
Heterocyclic compounds with 5 rings
Diols